Countess of Liverpool was launched in 1814 at Portland (Weymouth). She served from February 1814 to July 1827 as a Weymouth–Channel Islands sailing packet. From 1828 she started sailing to Brazil, and from 1830 to India. In 1833, she became leaky while sailing in the Indian Ocean. She was condemned in 1833 and then broken up at Mauritius in 1834.

Career
On 22 January 1814, Countess of Liverpool, Robert White, master, sailed to the Channel Islands on her first voyage as a packet on the Weymouth-Channel Islands run. She would serve until 1827.

She was on a voyage from Rio de Janeiro to Jersey. Countss of Liverppool rescued the crew. Courier was later refloated and taken in to Jersey in a severely damaged condition.

The Post Office purchased Countess of Liverpool from Captain White for £1,6777 14s 8d. It then sold her in 1827, or 1828.

Countess of Liverpool moved to the Thames after the Post Office in 1827 introduced steam packets to replace the sailing packets. She then started sailing between London and Brazil. She first appeared in Lloyd's Register (LR) in 1828.

In 1813 the British East India Company (EIC), had lost its monopoly on the trade between India and Britain. British ships were then free to sail to India or the Indian Ocean under a licence from the EIC. In 1830, Countess of Liverpool underwent small repairs and then on 3 July, sailed to Île de France.

Fate
On 3 October 1833 Countess of Liverpool, Talberts, master, put into Mahé, Seychelles, leaking badly. She was surveyed there, condemned, and sold.  She arrived at Mauritius in April 1834 for breaking up.

Notes

Citations

References
 
 
 
 

1814 ships
Age of Sail merchant ships of England
Packet (sea transport)